The educational organizations in North Paravur are list below.

Professional colleges 
Sree Narayana Medical College, Chalaka 
SNMIMT Engineering college, Maliankara 
SNGIST Professional College, Manjaly 
MES College of Engineering and Technology, Kunnukara 
Holymatha College of Technology, Manakkapady

Colleges 
Sngist Arts and Science College, Manakkappady
MES Arts and Science College, Kunnukara 
SNM College, Malankara, (Aided)
Kesari Arts & Science College, Kesari road,(NH) 
Sree Narayana Arts & Science College, Kedamangalam 
Presentation college, Puthanvelikkara 
IHRD College, Puthanvelikkara 
Mar Gregorious Arts & Science College 
CAPE College (proposed) 
Bishop Thannikode Memorial Women's College, Koonammavu
Lakshmi College, a parallel college with more than three thousand students 
Aurora Institute of Hotel Management and Culinary Arts,(Aurora IHMCA), North Paravur

Teacher education
SNM Training College, Moothakunnam (Aided) 
SNM TTI, Moothakunnam
HDPY B.Ed College, Mattupuram

Industrial training
SNM ITC Moothakunnam
Chavara ITC Koonammavu
Ghadi Gramaudyog Bhavan, Nanthiyattukunnam

Nursing
Donbosco, Fort road
Madhavi Sami Memorial School of Nursing, Eloor

Major schools

CBSE 
Infant Jesus Senior Secondary School, Kurumthottiparamb, 'North Paravur'
Holy India Group,(town)& Kaitharam, 'North Paravur'
Adarsha Vidya Bhavan Senior Secondary School, Nanthiyaattkunnam, North Paravur
MES Central School, Kunnukara
MES Central School, Eloor
Toc-H School, Eloor
Chavara Darsan CMI public School, Koonammavu
Little Hearts, Kizhkepram, Paravur
H.D.P.Y. English Medium School, Andippillikavu
Mannam Memorial N.S.S English Medium School Puthenvelikkara
Alengad Jamath School
Kadungallur Rajasree S.M.M School 
Mar Gregorious School, Paravur
Peace International School, Thathapilly
Maria Teresa Scrilli public school, court road North paravur
Tiny Tots Pre- Primary Smart School Valluvally N. Paravur

Aided and government 
Paliyam Government Higher Secondary School, Chendamangalam
Government Higher Secondary School (Boys), North Paravur
Government Higher Secondary School (Girls), North Paravur
Government Upper Primary School, Vadakkumpuram
Sree Narayana Higher Secondarty School, North Paravur
St. Aloysius Higher Secondary School, North Paravur
Samooham Higher Secondary School, North Paravur
Santa Cruz Lower primary School Koottukad
S N M higher secondary school moothakunnam

Other
Tiny Tots Day Care, Play School & Pre School (N. Parvoor)
 Tiny Tots Pre-Primary Smart School/Day Care/Play School Vazhikulangara North Paravur
G-TEC Education, North Paravoor

References 

North Paravur
Education in Ernakulam district